The Black Bear Sessions is the debut studio album by the bluegrass/jam band Railroad Earth, released in 2001.

Track listing
"Head" (Sheaffer) – 6:59
"Lordy Lordy" (Sheaffer) – 4:12
"Seven Story Mountain" (Sheaffer) – 6:02
"Chains" (Sheaffer) – 4:29
"Black Bear" (Sheaffer) – 9:13
"Colorado" (Goessling, Sheaffer) – 5:11
"Real Love" (Sheaffer) – 3:48
"Stillwater Getaway" (Goessling, Skehan) – 5:50
"Cold Water" (Tom Waits, Kathleen Brennan) – 3:52
"Railroad Earth" (Sheaffer) – 5:26

Personnel 
Tim Carbone – violin, harmonium, vocals, engineer
David Coulter – photography
Andy Goessling – guitar (acoustic), banjo, dobro, vocals, hi string guitar
Carey Harmon – percussion, drums, vocals
Gene Paul – mastering
Railroad Earth – producer
Brian Ross – executive producer
Todd Sheaffer – guitar (acoustic), harmonica, vocals
John Skehan – mandolin, vocals, photography
Don Sternecker – engineer
Dave Von Dollen – bass (upright)

External links
Railroad Earth official website

2001 albums
Railroad Earth albums